Luke Casserly (born 11 December 1973) is a former Australian international footballer. Casserly was born in Sydney and attended St. Dominic's College in Kingswood.

Biography 
Casserly made his senior debut for Marconi in the National Soccer League as a 17-year-old, and quickly established himself as an integral part of the first-team squad winning the National Soccer League championship in 1992/93. An enterprising wing back, Casserly spent 7 seasons with Marconi, earning International honours at Under 20 and Under 23 level, and ultimately making his full senior debut under Terry Venables against New Zealand in 1997.

He was lured to Northern Spirit in 1998, the newly formed National Soccer League franchise based in North Sydney. After two impressive seasons there, and in the prime of his career at 26, he moved to Sweden, signing with AIK. His progress at the Swedish club was steady, and he finally secured a regular starting position in his third season with the club, playing 30 out of a possible 36 matches. However, he failed to negotiate an improved contract, and returned to Australia, playing out the final seasons of the now defunct NSL with Marconi.

Despite the dawn of the A-League, Casserly elected to pursue more lucrative career interests outside of football, and continued to play football at the NSW Premier League level, where his clubs have included Marconi, Stanmore Hawks, Blacktown City and Manly United. The 2010 NSWPL season was Casserly's last as a player and he became head Coach of Marconi Stallions in 2011. After an average year in his first year as coach, Casserly managed to bring championship success to Marconi in 2012 winning the grand final match against Bonnyrigg White Eagles 2–0. This was Marconi's first championship victory since the 1992/93 NSL season. Casserly was part of that team as a player and has now become one of a rare few that have won titles with a club as both player and coach.

In 2013, Casserly was appointed as head of national performance of the Football Federation Australia.

Honours

Club
Marconi
NSL Champions: 1992–93
NSL Minor Premiership: 1995–96
NSL Championship Runners-up: 1995–96
NSWPL Champions :  2012

References

External links 

OzFootball profile

St. Dominic's College – Sporting Life
 Luke Casserly Interview

1973 births
Living people
Soccer players from Sydney
Australian expatriate soccer players
Australia international soccer players
Australia under-20 international soccer players
Olympic soccer players of Australia
Footballers at the 1996 Summer Olympics
Allsvenskan players
National Soccer League (Australia) players
Marconi Stallions FC players
Northern Spirit FC players
Expatriate footballers in Sweden
Association football defenders
Australian soccer players